Paul Devlin may refer to:

Paul Devlin (curler) (1946–2021), Canadian curler
Paul Devlin (filmmaker), sports editor and documentary filmmaker
Paul Devlin (footballer) (born 1972), Scottish footballer
Paul Devlin (Gaelic footballer), Tyrone Gaelic footballer and All Star nominee